p16 is a tumor-suppressing protein.

P16 may also refer to:

Aircraft 
 Berliner-Joyce P-16, a biplane fighter of the United States Army Air Corps
 FFA P-16, a Swiss prototype jet fighter
 Piaggio P.16, an Italian heavy bomber

Other uses 
 AMC Schneider P 16, a French halftrack
 Dongfeng Yufeng P16, a Chinese pickup truck
 Palmyra (Cooper) Airport on Palmyra Atoll
 Papyrus 16, a biblical manuscript
 Pseudomonas sRNA P16

See also
 16P (disambiguation)